The 1955 Round Australia Trial, officially the Redex Trial, was the third running of the Round Australia Trial. The rally took place between 21 August and 11 September 1955. The event covered 16,900 kilometres around Australia. It was won by Laurie Whitehead and Bob Foreman, driving a Volkswagen 1200.

Results

References

Rally competitions in Australia
Round Australia Trial